Squanto: A Warrior's Tale is a 1994 Canadian-American historical drama action adventure film. It was written by Darlene Craviato and directed by Xavier Koller. It is very loosely based on the actual historical Native American figure Squanto, and his life prior to and including the arrival of the Mayflower in 1620. It stars Adam Beach as the lead role of Squanto. It was originally released theatrically on October 28, 1994, and was shot in Louisbourg and Cape Breton, Nova Scotia. It received negative reviews and grossed only $3.3 million.

Plot
Set in the early 17th century, a Patuxet tribesman named Squanto (Adam Beach) is kidnapped by English sailors. He is then taken to England, along with Epenow (Eric Schweig), a Nauset from Martha's Vineyard who was also captured by the sailors.

When the ship they are on arrives in Plymouth, Squanto and Epenow are forced to work for the employer of the crew, Sir George (Michael Gambon). Squanto gets thrown in a ring with a giant Grizzly bear. Their battle becomes a spectacle for the attendees. However, Squanto is able to calm the angry bear down by singing a Patuxet Native American lullaby to it, the audience and Sir George watch in surprise as Squanto sings the bear to sleep. This finally gives Squanto the chance to escape, and he flees in a rowboat soon after. He's discovered lying unconscious on a rocky shore by a trio of monks who had been fishing.

Squanto is taken into their monastery, in spite of the reluctancy of its head, Brother Paul. The monk who offers the most open arms, Brother Daniel (Mandy Patinkin), becomes a mentor and friend to Squanto. From Brother Daniel, Squanto learns English, and at the same time, he imparts some knowledge about his world to his new housemates, introducing them to moccasins and popcorn. Brother Paul remains skeptical of 'the pagan' and in any possibility of a "New World".

Meanwhile, Sir George firmly believes that Squanto is the property of the Plymouth shipping company, and he has men on the hunt. After hiding while they ransack the monastery, Brother Paul gives permission for Brother Daniel to take Squanto to a ship in London due to sail in 15 days. While there, Squanto sees Epenow in Sir George's arena and tries to save him, only to end up captured. In another cinematic sequence, Squanto pulls off an improbable escape to accompany Epenow (who has falsely promised gold to Sir George) and a crew setting sail back to America.

When they reach the New World, they are greeted by Epenow's tribe and son, Pequod. After the celebrations, Squanto wakes to Epenow and the others torching the ship with all the crew aboard. During his captivity, Epenow has come to see the English as nothing but greedy enemies and wishes to destroy them. Squanto returns to his village, only to find devastation. His entire tribe (including his wife, Nakooma) has been completely wiped out due to illnesses brought by the Europeans.

When the Pilgrim settlers arrive, the Nauset tribe is ready to do battle. After overhearing Bradford and how he does not want to fight them, Squanto attempts to settle things peacefully. Pequod charges forward and is injured. Epenow allows the colony's doctor to treat him. Throughout the night, both sides continue to pray in their respective languages. After Pequod regains consciousness, the Nauset tribe leaves peacefully. The last scenes of the film portray the first Thanksgiving celebration.

Cast
 Adam Beach as Squanto 
 Sheldon Peters Wolfchild as Mooshawset 
 Irene Bedard as Nakooma 
 Eric Schweig as Epenow  
 Leroy Peltier as Pequod  
 Michael Gambon as Sir George 
 Nathaniel Parker as Thomas Dermer 
 Alex Norton as Harding 
 Mark Margolis as Captain Thomas Hunt
 Julian Richings as Sir George's Servant 
 Mandy Patinkin as Brother Daniel 
 Donal Donnelly as Brother Paul 
 Stuart Pankin as Brother Timothy 
 Paul Klementowicz as Brother James 
 Bray Poor as Dr. Fuller 
 Tim Hopper as William Bradford 
 John Saint Ryan as Myles Standish 
 John Dunn-Hill as Governor John Carver 
 Selim Running Bear Sandoval as Attaquin
 David Morley as Monk
 Shaun "Mavs" Gillis as Boy In Crowd
 Brian Sullivan as Canoe Wrangler
 Roger Chalifoux as Canoe Wrangler#2

Reception
Roger Ebert of the Chicago Sun-Times gave the film only one and a half stars and wrote: ""Squanto" is the kind of superficial, tidied-up, idealized history that might appeal to younger viewers. No thoughtful person will be able to take it seriously. For an incomparably more accurate and evocative portrayal of the earliest contacts between Native Americans and Europeans, see Bruce Beresford's "Black Robe" (1991), which is to "Squanto" as Geronimo is to Tonto." Lois Alter Mark from Entertainment Weekly gave it a C and stated: "Squanto: A Warrior’s Tale, the story of the first Thanksgiving as told by the Native American who brokered the event, has valuable lessons to teach, but it’s so self-conscious (not to mention misguided in parts) that it will probably be out of the theaters long before Turkey Day.". However, on Rotten Tomatoes, Squanto currently holds a 60% rating, based on 10 reviews.

Home media release
Walt Disney Home Video released the film on VHS on June 20, 1995, 3 days before the theatrical release of Pocahontas. It was released on a widescreen DVD on September 7, 2004.

References

External links
 
 
 

1990s action adventure films
1990s adventure drama films
1990s historical drama films
1994 films
American adventure drama films
Canadian drama films
1990s children's adventure films
1990s children's drama films
American children's adventure films
American children's drama films
English-language Canadian films
Films about Native Americans
Films about race and ethnicity
Films about slavery
Canadian films based on actual events
Films scored by Joel McNeely
Films set in England
Films set in North America
Films set in the 1600s
Films set in the 1610s
Films set in the 1620s
Films shot in Nova Scotia
Walt Disney Pictures films
1994 drama films
Films directed by Xavier Koller
Native American drama films
1990s English-language films
1990s American films
1990s Canadian films